Vreme, translated: Time, was a Macedonian daily newspaper.

References

External links
 

Newspapers published in North Macedonia
Macedonian-language newspapers
Publications with year of establishment missing